The Faisalabad Hockey Stadium is a multi-use stadium in Faisalabad, Pakistan. It is currently used mostly for field hockey matches. It is the third-largest hockey stadium in Pakistan (after Lahore and Karachi) having a capacity of 25,000.

It is located at Susan Road, a major shopping and restaurant area. It is located in the heart of the city and was built during the 1990s. It provides good facilities to the nursery of hockey in Pakistan, Gojra, as it is located in Faisalabad District. 

It is controlled by Pakistan Hockey Federation (PHF), which also looks after the management and other issues of the stadium with cooperation of provincial and local governments. It has floodlights and training facilities.

It is home ground of the Pakistan national field hockey team as well as regional teams. Many national level tournaments, such as National Hockey Championship, have been organized here.

History 
In 1985, the Government of Pakistan, decided to make Faisalabad a divisional headquarters and started many uplift projects in the city. The slow progress resulted in a total construction time of more than 10 years, with the construction being completed in 2002 as a part of these projects. Governor of Punjab Khalid Maqbool inaugurated the stadium on 16 April 2003. An AstroTurf surface was laid there the same year, and hasn't been replaced since in spite of its poor condition.

Faisalabad District has remained in the limelight in the history of Pakistan hockey because this district has been producing many national-level and Olympic hockey players.

See also
 List of stadiums in Pakistan
 List of cricket grounds in Pakistan
 List of sports venues in Karachi
 List of sports venues in Lahore
 List of sports venues in Faisalabad
 List of stadiums by capacity

References

Faisalabad
Field hockey venues in Pakistan
Buildings and structures in Faisalabad
Stadiums in Pakistan
Sports venues in Pakistan